The Richard and Geraldine Hodgson House is a historic house at 881 Ponus Ridge Road in New Canaan, Connecticut.  It is an International Style house that was built in 1951 to a design by Philip C. Johnson and Landis Gores.  It was listed on the National Register of Historic Places in 2005.

Description and history
The Hodgson House stands in rural-residential western New Canaan, at the southeast corner of Ponus Ridge Road and Arrowhead Trail.  It is a single-story steel-frame structure, with a central U-shaped block housing its public spaces and a rectangular bedroom wing attached via a hyphen.  The house is finished in brick and glass, with only wooden fascia.  The main block encloses a garden court that effectively merges indoor and outdoor living spaces.  The bedroom wing was designed to maximize privacy, with only the east-facing elevation having any windows.

The house was designed by architect Philip Johnson; its central block was built in 1950-51 and the bedroom wing, part of Johnson's design, was added in 1955.  At the time of the design work, Johnson was in partnership with Landis Gores. Johnson and Gores' partnership broke up soon after their work on this house, reportedly because Johnson was not interested in Gores' ideas for this house, according to Johnson biographer Franz Schulze.  The house was given the Honor Award by the American Institute of Architects in 1956.  Richard Hodgson, for whose family the house was built, was a prominent engineer and businessman who was an important early figure in the rise of Fairchild Semiconductor.

See also
Glass House, also NRHP-listed and designed by Johnson
National Register of Historic Places listings in Fairfield County, Connecticut

References

Houses in New Canaan, Connecticut
International style architecture in Connecticut
Houses on the National Register of Historic Places in Connecticut
Houses completed in 1951
1951 establishments in Connecticut
Modernist architecture in Connecticut
National Register of Historic Places in Fairfield County, Connecticut
Philip Johnson buildings